The Franklin Township School District is a community public school district that serves students in pre-kindergarten through eighth grade from Franklin Township, in Hunterdon County, New Jersey, United States.

As of the 2018–19 school year, the district, comprising one school, had an enrollment of 283 students and 29.0 classroom teachers (on an FTE basis), for a student–teacher ratio of 9.8:1.

Franklin Township was one of two districts added to the Interdistrict Public School Choice Program in October 2011, opening up three seats in each grade, a total of 27 student seats, that parents from outside the district may apply to fill to fill starting in the 2012-13 school year.

The district is classified by the New Jersey Department of Education as being in District Factor Group "I", the second-highest of eight groupings. District Factor Groups organize districts statewide to allow comparison by common socioeconomic characteristics of the local districts. From lowest socioeconomic status to highest, the categories are A, B, CD, DE, FG, GH, I and J.

Public school students in ninth through twelfth grades attend North Hunterdon High School in Annandale together with students from Bethlehem Township, Clinton Town, Clinton Township, Lebanon Borough and Union Township. As of the 2018–19 school year, the high school had an enrollment of 1,584 students and 123.2 classroom teachers (on an FTE basis), for a student–teacher ratio of 12.9:1. The school is part of the North Hunterdon-Voorhees Regional High School District, which also includes students from Califon, Glen Gardner, Hampton, High Bridge, Lebanon Township and Tewksbury Township, who attend Voorhees High School in Lebanon Township.

School
The Franklin Township School served an enrollment of 271 students in grades PreK-8 as of the 2018–19 school year.
Lindsay Gooditis, Principal

Administration
Core members of the district's administration are:
Nicholas Diaz, Superintendent
Lori Tirone, Business Administrator

Board of education
The district's board of education, with seven members, sets policy and oversees the fiscal and educational operation of the district through its administration. As a Type II school district, the board's trustees are elected directly by voters to serve three-year terms of office on a staggered basis, with three seats up for election each year held (since 2012) as part of the November general election.

References

External links
Franklin Township School
 
School Data for the Franklin Township School, National Center for Education Statistics
North Hunterdon-Voorhees Regional High School District

Franklin Township, Hunterdon County, New Jersey
New Jersey District Factor Group I
School districts in Hunterdon County, New Jersey
Public K–8 schools in New Jersey